Ulmus 'Morton' (selling name ) is an elm cultivar cloned from a putative intraspecific hybrid planted at the Morton Arboretum in 1924, which itself originated as seed collected from a tree at the Arnold Arboretum in Massachusetts. Although this tree was originally identified as Ulmus crassifolia, it is now believed to have been a hybrid of the Japanese elm (Ulmus davidiana var. japonica) and Wilson's elm (formerly Ulmus wilsoniana, but also sunk as U. davidiana var. japonica).  has proven to be the most successful cultivar tested in the US National Elm Trial, averaging a survival rate of 92.5% overall.

Description
The parent tree at the Morton Arboretum is noted for the resemblance of its habit to the American elm Ulmus americana, its upright-arching branches creating the familiar vase-shape, although the tree does not grow as large as the iconic native elm, reaching scarcely 20 m at maturity. Its glossy, deep green leaves are also markedly smaller, rarely exceeding 8 cm in length. The tree is commercially propagated by grafting onto an Ulmus pumila rootstock.

 has a propensity to produce co-dominant stems and major branches with bark inclusions, demanding corrective pruning on at least an annual basis where planted in towns.

Pests and diseases
In its 90+ years, the original tree at Morton has survived three epidemics of Dutch elm disease there unscathed. However, two trees included in trials at the University of Minnesota were found to be afflicted by the disease in 2004, although one appears to have recovered completely. The cultivar has also proved to be highly resistant to elm yellows and the elm leaf beetle Xanthogaleruca luteola   , but not to the Japanese beetle, which can cause extensive foliar damage.

Cultivation
 is reputed to grow well in almost all soils save those excessively wet, and is notably drought-tolerant and cold hardy. In artificial freezing tests at the Morton Arboretum the LT50 (temp. at which 50% of tissues die) was found to be −35.5 °C. The tree grows vigorously at first, gaining as much as one metre per annum, but slows to approximately half that rate with maturity. Thus, a typical 20-year-old tree could be expected to have reached 14 m in height with a crown about 5 m in width. Trees grown by Tollgate Education, Michigan State University, at Novi were the most vigorous and robust of the 37 different cultivars and species under assessment, described as looking like 'men among boys'.  is being evaluated in the National Elm Trial coordinated by Colorado State University.
 was introduced to Europe in 2006 and is now in commerce in the Netherlands.

Hybrid cultivars
 was crossed with the hybrid cultivar 'Morton Plainsman' = . A selection of the resultant seedlings was marketed under the name 'Charisma', later changed to 'Morton Glossy' = .

Synonymy
 Thornhill Elm: Anon.

Accessions
North America
Arnold Arboretum, US. Acc. no. 130–2002
Bickelhaupt Arboretum, US. Acc. no. 98–051
Brenton Arboretum, US. No details available.
Chicago Botanic Garden, US. 3 trees, no other details available.
Dawes Arboretum, US. 1 tree. No acc. details available.
Holden Arboretum, US. Acc. nos. 89–76, 91–114, 98–23, L–00–501
Morton Arboretum, US. Acc. nos. 2352–24, 255–74, 128–92, 272–97, 35–98, 280–2003. 495–2004, 1095–2004, 1246–2004, 1347–2004, 269–2008.
Parker Arboretum, US. No acc. details.
Smith College, US. Acc. nos. 20304, 35804, 37505
University of Idaho Arboretum, US. 2 trees. Acc. no. 1998008.
University of Washington campus, US. 5 trees.
Europe
Grange Farm Arboretum, UK. Acc. no. 503.
Great Fontley Farm, Fareham, UK. Butterfly Conservation Elm Trials plantation, Home Field, one small tree planted 2010. 
Royal Botanic Garden Edinburgh, UK. Acc. no. 20021372

Nurseries
North America
Acorn Farms, Galena, Ohio, US.
Bailey Nurseries, St. Paul, Minnesota, US.
Carlton Plants, LLC, Dayton, Oregon, US.
Charles J. Fiore, Prairie View, Illinois, US.
ForestFarm, Williams, Oregon, US.
J. Frank Schmidt & Son Co., Boring, Oregon, US.
Johnson's Nursery, Menomonee Falls, Wisconsin, US.
Linder's Garden Center, St. Paul, Minnesota, US.
North American Plants, Lafayette, Oregon, US.
Pea Ridge Forest, Hermann, Missouri, US.
Sester Farms , Gresham, Oregon, US.
Sun Valley Garden Centre, Eden Prairie, Minnesota, US.

Europe
Batouwe Boomkwekerijen B.V., Dodewaard, Netherlands. Potted whips.
Boomkwekerij Gebr. Van den Berk B.V., Sint-Oedenrode, Netherlands.

References

External links
Summary, inc. photographs, of elm cultivars resistant to Dutch elm disease available in the United States.
Warren, K., J. Frank Schmidt & Son Co. (2002). The Status of Elms in the Nursery Industry in 2000.
Miller, F. (2002). New elms for the landscape and urban forest.

Hybrid elm cultivar
Ulmus articles with images
Ulmus